Highway 161 (AR 161, Ark. 161, and Hwy. 161) is a designation for two state highways in Central Arkansas.  Both routes are maintained by the Arkansas Department of Transportation (ArDOT).

Route descriptions
One route of runs north the Jacksonville city limits near AR 440 to Vandenberg Boulevard near the Little Rock Air Force Base. A second route of  begins at U.S. Route 165/Highway 15/Highway 256 in England and runs north to terminate at Highway 165.

History
The 1959 Arkansas General Assembly passed and Governor Orval Faubus signed, Act 298, entitled "An Act to Remove a Part of State Highway 161 from the State Highway System" into law; removing a portion of Highway 161 between Faulkner Lake Rd and Highway 130 (present-day U.S. Route 165) from the state highway system. The rationale behind this legislation is not recorded in the minutes of the Arkansas State Highway Commission (ASHC) meeting, but the ASHC concurred with the General Assembly and removed the highway segment from the system on May 13, 1959.

The section between Prothro Junction and Jacksonville was formerly designated as US 67E. The route became Highway 161 on August 31, 1960 upon completion of the new US 67 alignment between Little Rock and Jacksonville. The ASHC closed a gap of  along the Lonoke County segment of Highway 161 on December 13, 1972. A segment between Cabot and El Paso was redesignated as Highway 5 on June 24, 1970.

The Arkansas State Highway Commission marked the segment between US 70 and the Jacksonville city limits for removal from the state highway system on December 9, 2021 following construction of a pavement improvement project along the route. The deletion was part of a deal with the cities of Little Rock, North Little Rock, and Pulaski County to cover the relocation costs for Rock Region Metro as part of the "30 Crossing" project on I-30.

Major intersections

See also

References

External links

161
Transportation in Lonoke County, Arkansas
Transportation in Pulaski County, Arkansas
U.S. Route 67
North Little Rock, Arkansas
Jacksonville, Arkansas